Samoana annectens is a species of tropical, air-breathing land snail, a terrestrial, pulmonate, gastropod mollusk in the family  Partulidae. This is one of many species known as the "Polynesian tree snail"; it is endemic to Huahine, French Polynesia.

References

A
Fauna of French Polynesia
Molluscs of Oceania
Gastropods described in 1864
Taxa named by William Harper Pease
Taxonomy articles created by Polbot